Jingbian County is a county under the administration of Yulin City, in the northwest of Shaanxi Province, China, bordering Inner Mongolia to the north and northwest and flanked in the north by the Mu Us Desert.

History 
The county was first established as Bian County in 1731, although the area has been inhabited since the Paleolithic era. Ruins of the 5th century Hun capital Tongwancheng can be found in the county.

Culture 
The county is known for its paper-cutting art and Xintianyou folk music and its culture is described as a mix between Chinese and Mongolian.

Economy 
A large gas field is located in Jingbian, and it is a hub of the West–East Gas Pipeline network. There are also significant coal and rock salt reserves.

Administrative divisions
As 2019, Jingbian County is in charge of one subdistrict and sixteen towns.
Subdistricts
 Zhangjiapan Subdistrict - it is upgraded from town.

Towns

- Towns are upgraded from townships.

- Towns are established newly.
 Huanghaojie

- Former Townships are merged to other.

Climate

Transportation 
G20 Qingdao–Yinchuan Expressway
G65 Baotou–Maoming Expressway
Taiyuan-Zhongwei-Yinchuan Railway

References

External links
Official website of People's Government of  Jingbian County 

County-level divisions of Shaanxi